Saffron Walden is a constituency in Essex represented in the House of Commons of the UK Parliament since 2017 by Kemi Badenoch, a Conservative.

History 
Saffron Walden was one of eight single-member divisions of Essex (later classified as county constituencies) created by the Redistribution of Seats Act 1885, replacing the three two member divisions of East, South and West Essex.

The boundaries were redrawn under the Representation of the People Act 1918, then remaining virtually unchanged until changes brought in for the 2010 general election by the Fifth Periodic Review of Westminster constituencies.

This has been a Conservative safe seat based on election results since 1922, in which period the majorities have occasionally been marginal. However, the constituency now has a Conservative majority of over 27,000.

Boundaries and boundary changes 

1885–1918: The Borough of Saffron Walden, the Sessional Divisions of Freshwell, Hinckford North, and Walden, part of the Sessional Division of Hinckford South (Halstead Bench), the part of the Borough of Sudbury in the county of Essex, and the parish of Thaxted.

Formed from northern parts of the abolished West Division of Essex including the Municipal Borough of Saffron Walden, and northern parts of the abolished East Division.

1918–1950: The Borough of Saffron Walden, the Urban District of Halstead, and the Rural Districts of Belchamp, Bumpstead, Dunmow, Halstead, Saffron Walden, and Stansted.

Gained northern parts of Epping, including Great Dunmow and Hatfield Broad Oak, and northern parts of Maldon, including Halstead.  Other minor changes.

1950–1974: The Borough of Saffron Walden, the Urban District of Halstead, the Rural Districts of Dunmow, Halstead, and Saffron Walden, and in the Rural District of Braintree the parishes of Bardfield Saling and Great Bardfield.

Local authorities re-organised – only nominal changes to boundaries of constituency.

1974–1983: The Borough of Saffron Walden, the Urban District of Halstead, and the Rural Districts of Dunmow, Halstead, and Saffron Walden.

The two small parishes within the Rural District of Braintree included in the new County Constituency of Braintree.

1983–1997: The District of Uttlesford, and the District of Braintree wards of Bumpstead, Castle Hedingham, Colne Engaine and Greenstead Green, Earls Colne, Gosfield, Halstead St Andrews, Halstead Trinity, Sible Hedingham, Stour Valley Central, Stour Valley North, Stour Valley South, Upper Colne, and Yeldham.

Local authorities re-organised – no changes to boundaries of constituency.

1997–2010: The District of Uttlesford, and the District of Braintree wards of Bumpstead, Castle Hedingham, Colne Engaine and Greenstead Green, Halstead St Andrews, Halstead Trinity, Sible Hedingham, Stour Valley Central, Stour Valley North, Stour Valley South, Upper Colne, and Yeldham.

Two small wards (Earls Colne and Gosfield) transferred to Braintree.

2010–present: The District of Uttlesford, and the Borough of Chelmsford wards of Boreham and The Leighs, Broomfield and The Walthams, Chelmsford Rural West, and Writtle.

The 2010 redistribution resulted in a major change, with eastern areas in the District of Braintree, including Halstead, being transferred to the County Constituency of Braintree. Extended southwards to incorporate northern and western rural areas of the Borough of Chelmsford, including Writtle, which were transferred from the abolished County Constituency of West Chelmsford.

Constituency profile

The constituency is by far the largest and most rural in Essex, and covers the entire north-west corner of the county: an area of almost . It borders Hertfordshire and Cambridgeshire, and also extends deep into the middle of Essex near Chelmsford.

Two medium-sized market towns, Saffron Walden and Dunmow are in the constituency. Both of these have historic links, and are busy and regionally visitor-drawing towns in the South East.

The largest single source of employment in the constituency is Stansted Airport, while there are also a host of small businesses, many of them high-tech, along and at the ends of the London-Cambridge corridor.

In statistics
The constituency consists of Census Output Areas of two local government districts with similar characteristics. Uttlesford district forms the bulk, and has a working population whose income is close to the national average and much lower than average reliance upon social housing.  At the end of 2012 the unemployment rate in the constituency stood at 1.6% of the population claiming jobseekers allowance, compared to the regional average of 2.4%. The borough contributing to the bulk of the seat has a very low 10.1% of its population without a car, 17.7% of the population without qualifications and a high 31.9% had level 4 qualifications or above. In terms of tenure 71.6% of homes are owned outright or on a mortgage as at the 2011 census across the Uttlesford district.

Members of Parliament 
Since the snap election in 2017, this safe Conservative seat has been represented by Kemi Badenoch. It was held for many years by former Chancellor of the Exchequer Rab Butler and by former Deputy Speaker of the House of Commons Sir Alan Haselhurst.

Elections

Elections in the 2010s

Elections in the 2000s

Elections in the 1990s

Elections in the 1980s

Elections in the 1970s

Elections in the 1960s

Elections in the 1950s

Election in the 1940s

Elections in the 1930s
General Election 1939–40:
Another General Election was required to take place before the end of 1940. The political parties had been making preparations for an election to take place from 1939 and by the end of this year, the following candidates had been selected; 
Conservative: Rab Butler
Labour: Clara Rackham

The Liberal candidate, Arthur Musgrove Mathews withdrew at the last minute

Elections in the 1920s

Elections in the 1910s

Elections in the 1900s

Elections in the 1890s

 Caused by Gardner's appointment as President of the Board of Agriculture

Elections in the 1880s

See also 
 List of parliamentary constituencies in Essex

Notes

References

|

Parliamentary constituencies in Essex
Constituencies of the Parliament of the United Kingdom established in 1885
Saffron Walden